"Money, Money, Money" is a song by ABBA.

Money, Money, Money may also refer to:

Money, Money, Money (film), a 1923 film directed by Tom Forman
"Money Money Money" (Kevin Ayers song), 1980

See also
"Money Money Money Money", the opening lyrics to "For the Love of Money", a 1974 song by The O'Jays